Han Chun-gyong (한춘경,born 28 March 1994) is a North Korean cross-country skier.  He competed in the men's 15 kilometre freestyle at the 2018 Winter Olympics.

References

External links
 

1994 births
Living people
North Korean male cross-country skiers
Olympic cross-country skiers of North Korea
Cross-country skiers at the 2018 Winter Olympics
Place of birth missing (living people)